Greater Isfahan Metropolitan Area is a metropolitan region in Isfahan Province, central Iran. This region, although not having any official designation and recognition yet, is the second biggest one in Iran, behind the capital city Tehran (Greater Tehran). The overall region has a population of over 3,500,000 and extends along Zayandeh Rud, the main river axis through the province, and also along the northern-southern axis of the city, plus a western axis towards Lorestan Province. The region is a transportation hub and an industrial centre having concentrated all steel related industries in it. The region is also home to important military installations and centres, including nuclear facilities and airbases.

References

External links
 

Isfahan Province
Metropolitan areas of Iran